Leo Murphy Drona, S.D.B, D.D. (born October 18, 1941) is the Bishop Emeritus of San Pablo in the Philippines.

Biography
Leo Murphy Drona was born on October 18, 1941 at Pangil, Laguna. He spent his elementary years at Thomas Earnshaw Elementary School, and spent his high school years at Don Bosco Technical Institute in Santa Ana, Manila. He spent his seminary training at Salesian Seminary College at Hong Kong, where he earned PhB. He was ordained to the priesthood on December 22, 1967.

He obtained his Licentiate of Sacred Theology, in 1968 from the Universita Pontificia Salesiana in Rome. He was appointed as Dean of College of Don Bosco College Seminary in Calamba, Laguna from 1968–1973, then was appointed as Rector of Don Bosco College Seminary in Calamba, Laguna from 1974–1981, and then appointed as Vice-Provincial Superior of SDB Provincial Office, BLS-Parañaque from 1981-1987.

On July 25, 1987, he was consecrated as bishop. He served as Bishop of San Jose, Philippines from 1987 to 2004.

He succeeded Francisco San Diego of Laguna in 2004 becoming the third bishop of the Diocese of San Pablo, also becoming the first native of Laguna to serve that post.

On January 25, 2013, Pope Benedict XVI accepted the early retirement of Bishop Drona from the pastoral duties in the Diocese of San Pablo and appointed Bishop Buenaventura Famadico to continue the pastoral leadership in the Diocese.

References

 Diocese of San Pablo, Philippines
 MOST REV. LEO M. DRONA, SDB, D.D.
 Bishop Leo Murphy Drona (Catholic-Hierarchy)

Roman Catholic bishops of San Pablo
1941 births
Living people
People from Laguna (province)
20th-century Roman Catholic bishops in the Philippines
21st-century Roman Catholic bishops in the Philippines
Filipino bishops